Big Brook is a resettled community in Newfoundland and Labrador.

See also 
 List of ghost towns in Newfoundland and Labrador

Ghost towns in Newfoundland and Labrador